"Children" is a song by English recording artist V V Brown, initially released as the lead single from her shelved second studio album Lollipops & Politics. Written by Brown, the song also guest features American rapper Chiddy and was released to US iTunes on 20 September 2011. Brown later confirmed via Facebook that the song would be released in Europe at a future date; however this planned release was scrapped when Brown decided not to release the album. The song samples the classic children's playground song "Do Your Ears Hang Low?" in the beginning and end of the song.

Critical reception
Rap-Up described 'Children' as an "Irresistible pop-gem that you can knock in your whip or jump rope to." It has been credited for its upbeat catchy tune and boasts an infectious hook.

Arjanwrites gave the song a positive review, complimenting Brown on "serving up something fresh, but also for speaking her mind honestly with a compelling call to action that will leave listeners inspired." They praise Brown for creating a song that is fresh and different, yet distinctly very 'VV Brown.'

Music video
The video is set in downtown Los Angeles and shows Brown riding her bike through the street, playing basketball with the people, dancing down the sidewalk, as well as showing groups of families. The video also shows Brown standing amongst people reflecting the town in a mirror to the camera. Brown described the video as 'Real' and shows her enjoying the simple things in life.

In 2015, four years after the record's cancellation, Brown expressed distaste for the music video, claiming it was a sign that she had "soul her soul."

Track listings and formats 
Single Promo
 "Children" (feat. Chiddy) – 3:15

iTunes EP
 "Children" (feat. Chiddy) – 3:15
 "Children (Keep On Singing)" – 3:14
 "Children (Acoustic)" – 3:34

Children [& Remixes]
 "Children" (feat. Chiddy) – 3:15
 "Children (Easy Does It Remix)" – 4:17
 "Children (Mike Rizzo Funk Radio Remix)" – 3:42
 "Children (Twice As Nice Radio Remix)" – 3:13
 "Children (Club Cheval Remix - English Version)" – 3:56
 "Children (Club Cheval Remix - French Version)" – 3:57

Release history

References 

2011 singles
V V Brown songs
Songs written by E. Kidd Bogart
Songs written by V V Brown
2011 songs
Capitol Records singles
Songs written by Chuck Harmony